is one of 24 wards of Osaka, Japan. It has an area of 4.37 km², and a population of 51,567.

General information 
Largely a residential area itself, Naniwa-ku is adjacent to and has in recent years blurred into the Namba district, which is south Osaka's transport hub and centre of commerce, entertainment, shopping, and culture.

Naniwa retains significant Burakumin and Korean communities. The plight and struggle of both communities in Japan is represented in Liberty Osaka (Osaka Human Rights Museum).

Almost the entire ward was decimated in air attacks during bombing in March, 1945. Few buildings pre-dating World War II remain.

Attractions 
Naniwa is the site of a number of well-known commercial areas like Nipponbashi, where Capcom and SNK are headquartered. Locally known as Den Den Town (Electric City), Nipponbashi was traditionally a concentration for Osaka's electrical appliance outlets, though the emergence of several large electrical department stores over in recent years has seen its shop space make a gradual shift away from the electrical appliance sector. Directly to its south is Shin Sekai (New World), an entertainment district famous for the Tsutenkaku Tower and Janjan Alley.

Amongst Naniwa's sites is the Imamiya Ebisu Shrine, which sponsors the lively Toka Ebisu Festival. Naniwa is the site of the Osaka Prefectural Gymnasium (Osaka-furitsu taiiku-kaikan), where the Grand Sumo Tournament is held in March (Ozumo Sangatsu Basho) and Liberty Osaka - the Osaka Human Rights Museum. Naniwa also contains the massive modern shopping, dining, and entertainment complex, Namba Parks.

Landmarks 
 Den Den Town
 Festival Gate
 Imamiya Ebisu Shrine
 Namba City
 Namba Parks
 Osaka City Air Terminal
 Osaka Prefectural Gymnasium
 Tsutenkaku
 Liberty Osaka (Osaka Human Rights Museum)
 Sports Palace, Osaka

Mass media

Newspaper
Sankei Shimbun - Namba Sankei Building

FM Radio Station
FM OSAKA - Minatomachi River Place

Train stations 
JR West
Kansai Line (Yamatoji Line): Shin-Imamiya Station - Imamiya Station - JR Namba Station
Osaka Loop Line: Ashiharabashi Station - Imamiya Station - Shin-Imamiya Station
Nankai Railway (In registration, Namba Station on Nankai Railway is located in Chūō-ku, and Shin-Imamiya Station in Nishinari-ku)
Nankai Main Line: Imamiyaebisu Station (only local trains of the Koya Line stop)
Kōya Line (Shiomibashi Branch): Shiomibashi Station - Ashiharachō Station
Hanshin Railway
Hanshin Namba Line Sakuragawa Station
Osaka Metro (In registration, Namba Station is located in Chūō-ku)
Midōsuji Line: Daikokuchō Station
Yotsubashi Line: Namba Station (a platform) - Daikokuchō Station
Sennichimae Line: Sakuragawa Station
Sakaisuji Line: Ebisuchō Station
Hankai Tramway (In registration, Minami-Kasumichō Station is located in Nishinari-ku)
Hankai Line: Ebisuchō Station

Education

The Osaka Chinese School is in Naniwa-ku.

Companies headquartered in Naniwa-ku, Osaka 
Kubota
Nankai Electric Railway
Pixela Corporation
Tabio

Notable people from Naniwa-ku, Osaka 
Atomi Kakei, Japanese calligrapher, painter, scholar and educator
Daizen Takahiro, Japanese sumo wrestler
Junko Noda, Japanese voice actress and singer
Kazumi Takahashi, Japanese novelist and scholar
Masatoshi Hamada, Japanese comedian (Downtown)
Shinobu Orikuchi, Japanese ethnologist, linguist, folklorist, novelist, and poet

References

External links

Official website of Naniwa 

Wards of Osaka